Zimredda (Lachish mayor) was a leader of Lachish in the mid 14th century BC. He is mentioned in the Amarna letters, and is the author of EA 329, (EA for 'el Amarna'). Only two other references are made to "Zimredda of Lakiša"–(Lachish) in the corpus. He is part of the subject of letter EA 333, titled:  "Plots and disloyalty" . His death is reported in EA 288 by Abdi-Heba–(letter no. 4 of 6), at the hands of the Habiru.

In the Amarna letters correspondence, from 1350-1335 BC, the other mayor of Lakiša was Šipti-Ba'lu, author of letters EA .

"Zimredda of Lakiša" letter--no. 329
Title: Preparations under way. EA 329, lines 1-20 (complete)

See also
Zimredda of Sidon
Amarna letters

References
Moran, William L. The Amarna Letters. Johns Hopkins University Press, 1987, 1992. (softcover)

Canaanite people
Amarna letters writers
14th-century BC people